Mehmet Altan Öymen (born 20 June 1932) is a Turkish journalist, author and former politician.

Biography
Öymen graduated from the School of Political Science of Ankara University. He began his journalist career already in 1950 at age of 18, and worked as reporter, columnist and editor-in-chief long time for the major newspapers like Ulus, Akşam, Cumhuriyet and Milliyet. He founded the press agency Anka news agency in 1972. In the 1960s, Altan Öymen served as the press attaché in Bonn, Federal Republic of Germany.

He entered politics in 1961 as member of the parliament that was formed after the military coup in Turkey, 1960. He was elected in 1977 as the deputy of Ankara from the Republican People's Party (CHP) to the Turkish Grand National Assembly, and became minister for tourism and public relations in the cabinet of Bülent Ecevit's second government, which lasted only one month in the summer 1977. He was reelected in 1995 as the deputy of Istanbul from the CHP.

Following the resignation of Deniz Baykal from the presidency of CHP, he was elected leader on 23 May 1999. He acted 15 months long at this post, before Deniz Baykal was reelected at the next extraordinary party congress in 2000.

Öymen resumed his journalist career, which he had interrupted during his party leadership, and wrote on political issues in his column in the newspaper Radikal.

In the 1980s and 1990s, he was awarded several times for his journalism.

Bibliography
 Mobilya Dosyası (The Furniture File), um:ag Press (1997), with Uğur Mumcu, 300p., 
 Bir Dönem Bir Çocuk (One Era One Child), Doğan Press (2002), 606 p., 
 Değişim Yılları (The Transition Times), Doğan Press (2004), 670 p., 
Öfkeli Yıllar (The Angry Years), Doğan Press (2009) 608 pg., 
... ve İhtilal , Doğan Press (2013) 754 pg., 
Umutlar ve İdamlar , Doğan Press (2018) 447 pg., 
''Kayıp Yaz", Doğan Press (2016) 329 pg.,

Notes

References
 Who is Who - Biography of Altan Öymen 

1932 births
Living people
People from Istanbul
Republican People's Party (Turkey) politicians
Ankara University Faculty of Political Sciences alumni
Turkish journalists
Turkish writers
Government ministers of Turkey
Leaders of the Republican People's Party (Turkey)
Ulus (newspaper) people
Cumhuriyet people
Milliyet people
Ministers of Culture of Turkey
Deputies of Istanbul
Radikal (newspaper) people
Leaders of political parties in Turkey
Members of the 20th Parliament of Turkey
Members of the 40th government of Turkey
Ministers of Tourism of Turkey